The wildlife of Canada or biodiversity of Canada consist of over 80,000 classified species, and an equal number thought yet to be recognized. Known fauna and flora have been identified from five kingdoms: protozoa (approximately 1% of recorded species); chromist (approximately 4% of recorded species); fungis (approximately 16% of recorded species); plants (approximately 11% of recorded species); and animals (approximately 68% of recorded species). Insects account for nearly 70 percent of recorded animal species in Canada.

There are 20 major ecosystems – ecozones – in Canada: 15 terrestrial and 5 marine. Canada's major biomes are the tundra, boreal forest, grassland, and temperate deciduous forest. Since the end of the last glacial period, Canada has consisted of eight distinct forest regions, with approximately half of its land area covered by forests (roughly 8 percent of the world's forested land).

Due to human activities, invasive species and environmental issues in the country, there are currently more than 800 species at risk of being lost. About 65 percent of Canada's resident species are considered secure. Protected and conservation areas have been established to preserve and restore Canadian flora and fauna species. Approximately 5000 Canadian animal species and 30,000 Canadian plant species are restricted from export for international trade.

Biodiversity

Habitat

Canada is divided into fifteen terrestrial and five marine ecozones, such as the forests of British Columbia and Central Canada, the prairies of Western Canada, the tundra of Northern Canada, and the marine ecosystems of the Arctic, Atlantic Canada and Pacific coast. The largest marine ecozone is the Arctic Archipelago (which covers about 15 percent of Canada, or 1.5 million km2), whereas the largest terrestrial ecozone is the Boreal Shield (covering 20 percent of Canada, or 1.9 million km2). 

Canada's major biomes are the tundra, boreal forest, grassland, and temperate deciduous forest. British Columbia has a multitude of smaller biomes, including: a subalpine forest which extends into Alberta, a temperate rainforest along the coast, a semi arid desert located in the Okanagan Valley and alpine tundra in the higher mountainous regions. 

Over half of Canada's landscape is intact and relatively free of human development. The boreal forest of Canada is considered to be the largest intact forest on earth, with around  undisturbed by roads, cities or industry. The Canadian Arctic tundra is the second-largest vegetation region in the country consisting of dwarf shrubs, sedges and grasses, mosses and lichens. The Canadian Prairies a temperate grassland with shrubland and northern mixed grasslands are used for rearing livestock and cultivating crops. Only seven percent of Canada's land is suitable for large scale agricultural production.

Canada has over 2,000,000 lakes—563 greater than —which is more than any other country hosting a multitude of unique ecosystems. Canada is home to about twenty five percent (134.6 million ha) of the world's wetlands that support a vast array of local ecosystems. Canada's waterways have their own ecosystems; with the two longest rivers being the Mackenzie River, that begins at Great Slave Lake and ends in the Arctic Ocean, with its drainage basin covering a large part of northwestern Canada, and the Saint Lawrence River, which drains the Great Lakes into the Gulf of St. Lawrence ending in the Atlantic Ocean.

Fauna

There are approximately 200 mammal species, over 460 bird species, over 40 amphibian species, over 40 reptile species, and over 1,200 fish species in Canada. Invertebrates present include 55,000 species of insects and 11,000 species of mites and spiders.

The Great Lakes region is home to the black bear, Virginia opossum, red squirrels, North American beaver, and striped skunks; birds include eastern bluebird, red-winged blackbird, robin, wood thrush, woodpecker, oriole, bobolink, crow, hawk, bittern, heron, black duck, and loon. The boreal forest region contains moose, caribou, Canadian lynx, timber wolf, marten, porcupine, snowshoe rabbit, and chipmunk. The Rocky Mountain region fauna included the grizzly bear, mountain goat, bighorn sheep, elk, cougar, and flying squirrel. 

The Pacific ecozone is home to the Cascade mountain goat, mountain beaver, a vast variety of mice, and puget striped skunk; birds include northern pigmy-owl, band-tailed pigeon, black swift, northern flicker, crow, rufous-sided towhee, and black brant. Residence species of the Great Plains ecoregion includes the desert cottontail, deer mouse gophers, plains bison, and several types of prairie dogs (black-tailed, white-tailed, and gunnison's), alongside many prairie birds. The Arctic expanse includes fauna such as the musk ox and reindeer, polar bear, white and blue fox, arctic hare, and lemming; with birds such as the snowy owl, willow ptarmigan, snow bunting and arctic tern.

Walrus, dolphins, seals, sea turtles, whales and sharks inhabit Canada's coastal waters. Seal species include harbor seal, harp seal, hooded seal, grey seal, bearded seal, northern fur seal, northern elephant seal, ringed seal, Steller sea lion, and California sea lion among others. Salt-water fish including the Atlantic cod, Pacific salmon, hake, haddock and halibut; alongside crustaceans such as lobster, snow crab and shrimp are the primary commercial species. Walleye (AKA pickerel), northern pike, rainbow trout, largemouth bass and the black crappie are common fresh-water fish species found throughout the country. Canada hosts many amphibian, including salamanders as well as frogs and toads and many species of reptile, including turtles, lizards, and snakes. 

Many of North America's migratory birds, including songbirds, waterfowl and shorebirds, take up residence in Canada during the spring and summer. In addition to native and migratory mammals, many Eurasian mammals were introduced to Canada either intentionally or accidentally. Among them are domestic mammals, such as the horse, pig, sheep, dog, cat, and cattle, and wild mammals, such as the brown rat and the house mouse.

Flora

According to Environment and Climate Change Canada, the nation hosts approximately 17,000 identified species of trees, flowers, herbs, ferns, mosses and other flora. Approximately 95 percent of the vascular plants in Canada are of the flowering variety. Over 90% of Canada's forests are owned by the public (crown land, and the majority being provincial forests). About half of the forests are allocated for logging. 

The Great Lakes region flora includes white pine, hemlock and red maples, yellow birch, and beech trees. The Maritime region is dominated by the red spruce, while the black spruce is prevalent in the eastern Laurentian, with spruce in the western Laurentian. The balsam fir, white cedar tamarack, white birch, and aspen and jack pine are also found in the eastern portion of the country. The tundra is home to the aspen, bur oak, balm of Gilead, cottonwood and balsam poplar.

The west coast has the western hemlock, red cedar, Douglas fir, Sitka spruce, and western white pine being dominate. The Rocky Mountain region consistent of alpine fir, Engelmann spruce, lodgepole pine and mountain hemlock. Other native plants seen across Canada include; American ginseng, trillium cernuum, red bearberry, bog Labrador tea, purple prairie clover, sand cherry, Pallas' wallflower, little evening primrose, showy orchis and common eelgrass.

Species at risk 

Canada's Species at Risk Act (SARA) is the federal government legislation to prevent wildlife species from becoming extinct. The goal of the act is to protect endangered or threatened organisms and their habitats. Provinces, territories and large municipalities also have their own species and habitat conservation regulations. 

Although Canada has a low percentage of endemic species compared to other countries; pollution, loss of biodiversity, over-exploitation of commercial species, invasive species and habitat loss have threatened many species. More than 800 species are listed as being at risk of extinction, including 363 classified as endangered species, —190 threatened species, —235 special concern, and 22 extirpated (no longer found in the wild). Species at risk include the Canada lynx, polar bear, sea otter, wolverine, black-footed ferret, northern fur seal, steller sea lion, hooded seal, North Atlantic right whale, sei whale and whooping crane.

In addition to the extirpated species, at least 19 have become completely extinct, meaning more than 30 species of plants and animals have disappeared from Canada since the arrival of European settlers in the 16th century. These include the Dawson's caribou, sea mink, great auk, Labrador duck, passenger pigeon, deepwater cisco, longjaw cisco, Banff longnose dace, and blue walleye.

Invasive species

Over 1400 invasive species of fish, plants, insects and invertebrates have been introduced to Canada through intentional and unintentional means. Over 450 invasive flora and over 400 invasive insects have been identified. The Great Lakes region (Laurentia bioregion) is home to nearly 200 invasive species, making it one of Canada's most heavily affected ecosystems. Freshwater ecosystems are disproportionately more imperilled compared to terrestrial ecosystems.

Invasive species such as the sea lamprey, zebra mussels, European green crab, the mountain pine beetle, round goby, Asian long-horned beetle, emerald ash borer, didymo, spongy moth, and Asian carp have altered local habitats and caused essential ecosystems to decline or fail, driving native species towards extinction. 

The most invasive flora species are the purple loosestrife, yellow iris, dog-strangling vine, knapweed, and leafy spurge. The fungi causing Dutch elm disease is another notable invasive. These species can spread aggressively, outcompete native wild vegetation and overwhelm agricultural crops. 

Invasive species cost billions of dollars each year from the loss of economic value of crops, forests and fisheries. According to Environment and Climate Change Canada, in 2004 the estimated annual lost revenue caused by the top 16 invasive species was between $13 to $35 billion. The economic cost to agricultural crops and forestry alone is estimated at $7.5 billion.

Conservation 

Approximately 12.1 percent of the nation's landmass and freshwater are considered conservation areas, including 11.4 percent designated as protected areas. Approximately 13.8 percent of Canada's territorial waters are conserved, including 8.9 percent designated as protected areas. Terrestrial areas conserved have increased by 65 percent in the 21st century, while marine areas conserved have increased by more than 3,800 percent. Conservation and protected areas have different mandates depending on the organization which manages them, with some areas having a greater focus on ecological integrity, historical preservation, public usage, scientific research, or a combination of usages. Some regions within Canada's largest conserved areas are heavily commercialized featuring grand buildings such as the Banff Springs Hotel and Chateau Lake Louise. 

Canada established the world's first national park management agency the Dominion Parks Branch now Parks Canada in 1911. In 1916, Canada and the United States signed the Migratory Birds Convention, which regulates the hunting of transcontinental migratory birds under the Migratory Birds Convention Act. The Canada Wildlife Act of 1973 goal is research on wildlife with a focus on larger species. The 1985 Fisheries Act regulates fishing, including the conservation and protection of fish and their spawning grounds. The National Marine Conservation Areas Act established a system of national marine conservation areas in 2002.

The primary focus of the Canadian national parks system is to preserve ecological integrity. National Marine Conservation Areas, while also under federal control, do not afford the same level of protection. The Canadian Wildlife Service, a division of Environment and Climate Change Canada, manages the National Wildlife Areas, Marine Wildlife Areas, and Migratory Bird Sanctuaries for the protection of wildlife. Provincial and territorial governments also protect areas within their boundaries. Urban parks in Canada are operated by municipal governments for public recreation and foliage preservation in cities. Some areas such as the Polar Bear Pass, are co-managed and overseen by government and local indigenous agencies.

Canada's first national park, Banff National Park established in 1885, spans  of mountainous terrain, with many glaciers and ice fields, dense coniferous forest, and alpine landscapes. Canada's largest national wildlife region is the Scott Islands Marine National Wildlife Area, which spans , protects critical breeding and nesting habitat for over 40 percent of British Columbia's seabirds.

National wildlife symbols 

Canada does not have a floral emblem or bird emblem at the national level.

Provincial and territorial wildlife symbols

Canadian provinces and territories have a variety of official fauna, flora and organic matter based on the biodiversity of the area.

See also

Notes

References

Further reading 

 
Drushka, Ken (2003), Canada's forests: a history, McGill-Queen's University Press, 
 
 
 Ross, Alexander Milton (1871),  The Birds of Canada, Rowsell and Hutchison. 

 Parks Canada (2003), Terrestrial Ecozones of Canada -

External links

Wildlife, plants and species - Government of Canada 
Ecosystem Status and Trends 2010 - Government of Canada
Species at Risk Public Registry - Canadian Wildlife Federation

 
 
 
Canada